Edmund Hartt (1744-1824) was a master carpenter and owned the shipyard in Boston, Massachusetts where  was constructed in 1797. The shipyard was located in the North End of Boston, near the location of the present Coast Guard base.

Hartt and his descendants lived for many years in "Hartt House" at 24-26 Hull Street in Boston. He is buried at Copp's Hill Burying Ground in Boston. His son, Samuel Hartt, was also a prominent shipbuilder for the U.S. Navy who built the first steamship and ironclad ships for the Navy.

References 

American shipbuilders
Businesspeople from Boston
18th century in Boston
19th century in Boston
Economic history of Boston
Year of death unknown
Year of birth unknown
Burials in Boston